Betfair Australia is the Australian operation of the web betting exchange, Betfair. Established in 2005, Betfair Australia operates Australia's only betting exchange under a Tasmanian Gaming Licence. Since August 2014 Betfair Australia has been fully owned by Crown Resorts.

History
Betfair UK was founded in 2000 by Andrew Black and Edward Wray. In 2004 Betfair signed a joint venture agreement with Australia's Publishing and Broadcasting Limited to start the Australian exchange. Betfair was awarded a non-exclusive licence by the Tasmanian Gaming Commission in February 2006 to conduct Australia's first betting exchange. Later that year Betfair Australia's market operations team managed its first market and shortly after the first telephone betting calls were taken by Betfair Australia staff.

Operations
In November 2005 the Government of Tasmania announced a deal to license Betfair in Tasmania. It was the second licence awarded to Betfair outside the UK - the first being in Malta with subsequent licences following in Austria and Germany - and Tasmania now receives substantial tax revenues.

In August 2006 the first bet is matched on the Australian exchange. There have since been more than 350 million bets placed and more than two million calls have been taken. Around 400,000 unique markets have been settled.

A ban on the use of betting exchanges took effect in Western Australia on 29 January 2007, with Betfair successfully claiming this new law violated the Constitution of Australia.

In a unanimous verdict by the High Court of Australia on 27 March 2008, the two provisions of the legislation, purporting to ban Western Australians from using a betting exchange and prohibiting an unauthorised business from using Western Australian race lists, were declared invalid as they applied to Betfair. The provisions were characterised as imposing a burden on interstate trade that was protectionist in nature, and therefore contravened section 92 of the Commonwealth Constitution.

However, in the 2012 High Court case of Betfair Pty Limited v Racing New South Wales, Betfair's appeal, against a newly enacted fee to access New South Welsh vital race field information, was rejected. The Court held that the relevant law would have no discriminatory or protectionist effect on interstate trade, thereby complying with section 92 of the Constitution of Australia, and that Betfair had not proven that the fee would cause significant economic damage (not to the extent of the appellants in Castlemaine Tooheys Ltd v South Australia).

In August 2014 Betfair completed the sale of their 50% stake in Betfair Australia to venture partner Crown Resorts, one of Australia's largest gaming and entertainment groups. The stake was valued at £5.5m.
In 2008 it was calculated that Betfair handle more transactions than all of Europe's stock exchanges combined – an average of 5 million a day, 99.9% are successfully completed in under one second.
Betfair Australia set a world record for most money traded in a single market in March 2015 when $184,383,446 was matched in-play for the 2015 ICC Cricket World Cup semi-final between South Africa and New Zealand. In a see-sawing match favouritism changed 31 times throughout the game with South Africa trading at $1.58 in the last over and then going on to lose with $8.58mil matched on them at less than $1.35.

Betting Exchange
Betfair Australia is the only betting exchange in operation in Australia. A betting exchange is a marketplace for customers to bet on the outcome of discrete events. Betting exchanges offer the same opportunities to bet as a bookmaker with a few differences. You can buy and sell the outcome, you can trade in real-time throughout the event and you trade out to cut your losses or lock in profit. Bookmaker operators generate revenue by offering less efficient odds. Betting exchanges normally generate revenue by charging a transaction fee.

Traditionally betting has occurred between a customer and a bookmaker where the customer 'backs' (bets that an outcome will occur) and the bookmaker 'lays' (bets that the outcome will not occur). Betting exchanges offer the opportunity for anyone to both back and lay.

For example, if someone thinks Team A will win a competition, he may wish to back that selection. A bookmaker offering the punter that bet would be laying that selection. The two parties will agree the backer's stake and the odds. If the team loses, the layer/bookmaker keeps the backer's stake. If the team wins, the layer will pay the backer the winnings based on the odds agreed.
As every bet transacted requires a backer and a layer, and the betting exchange is not a party to the bets transacted on it, any betting exchange requires both backers and layers.

References

Australian companies established in 2005
Gambling companies established in 2005
Online gambling companies of Australia
Australian subsidiaries of foreign companies